Joseph John Rice (December 6, 1871—April 1, 1938) was an American prelate of the Roman Catholic Church. He served as bishop of the Diocese of Burlington in Vermont from 1910 to his death.

Biography

Early life 
Joseph Rice was born on December 6, 1871, in Leicester, Massachusetts, to Henry and Catherine (née Donnelly) Rice. After graduating from Leicester Academy in Leicester in 1888, he studied at Holy Cross College in Worcester, Massachusetts (1888–1891) and at the Grand Seminary of Montreal in Montreal, Quebec (1891–1894).

Priesthood 
Returning to Massachusetts, Rice was ordained to the priesthood for the Diocese of Springfield in Massachusetts by Bishop Thomas Beaven on September 29, 1894. He then travelled to Rome to study, earning a Doctor of Divinity degree from the College of the Propaganda in 1896.

Following his return to the United States, Rice was assigned to a parish in Portland, Maine.  He was then sent to Northern Maine to do missionary work among Native Americans there. Rice's next pastoral assignment was as an assistant pastor at St. Bernard's parish in Fitchburg, Massachusetts. He was then appointed as pastor of a French-Canadian parish in Pittsfield, Massachusetts. Rice also served in parishes in Oxford, Massachusetts and Whitinsville, Massachusetts. Rice was professor of philosophy at St. John's Seminary in Boston until 1903, when he was tasked with erecting St. Peter's Parish in Northbridge, Massachusetts.

Bishop of Burlington 
On January 8, 1910, Rice was appointed bishop of the Diocese of Burlington by Pope Pius X. He received his episcopal consecration on April 14, 1910, from Bishop Thomas Beaven, with Bishops Matthew Harkins and Louis Walsh serving as co-consecrators, at the Cathedral of the Immaculate Conception in Burlington.

During his 28-year-long tenure, Rice placed De Goesbriand Memorial Hospital under the care of the Religious Hospitallers of St. Joseph, and opened three high schools and Trinity College. He was also confronted with a case of anti-Catholicism; in November 1925, the Ku Klux Klan burned a cross on the steps of St. Augustine's Church at Montpelier, Vermont.

Joseph Rice died on April 1, 1938 at age 66. He is buried at Resurrection Park in South Burlington, Vermont.

References

\

1871 births
1938 deaths
Leicester Academy alumni
College of the Holy Cross alumni
Roman Catholic Diocese of Springfield in Massachusetts
People from Leicester, Massachusetts
Roman Catholic bishops of Burlington
20th-century Roman Catholic bishops in the United States
Religious leaders from Massachusetts
Catholics from Massachusetts